Lahugada is a genus of cicadas in the family Cicadidae, found in India. There is at least one described species in Lahugada, L. dohertyi.

Lahugada is the only genus of the tribe Lahugadini.

References

Further reading

 
 
 
 
 
 
 
 
 

Cicadinae
Cicadidae genera